Auto Shanghai, officially known as the Shanghai International Automobile Industry Exhibition, is a biennial international automobile show that alternates with the Beijing Auto Show (Auto China) as China's yearly international automotive exhibition. First held in 1985, Auto Shanghai is the nation's oldest auto exhibition, and is considered as an important major international auto show.

Due to the greatly expanding presence of foreign brands in the Chinese markets, Auto Shanghai has become one of the premier international auto shows alongside Detroit, Frankfurt, Paris and Tokyo, and was also the first Chinese auto show to join the Union des Foires Internationales (UFI). Since 2015, the show is hosted at the National Center for Exhibition and Convention, located next to the Shanghai Hongqiao International Airport.

2021
The 2021 show ran from 19 April to 28 April. It was the first major auto show to be held since the start of the COVID-19 pandemic.
 19–20 April — Press day
 21–28 April — Open to the public

Introductions

 Aeolus Yixuan Max
 Arcfox Alpha-S
 Audi A6 e-tron concept
 Audi A7L
 Audi Q2L and Audi Q2L e-tron facelift
 Audi Q5L facelift
 Baojun Valli
 Bestune T55
 Buick Envision Plus
 Buick Verano Pro
 Cadillac Lyriq concept (public debut)
 Changan CS55 Plus
 Citroën C5 X
 Exeed Stellar Concept
 Ford Equator
 Ford Evos
 Ford Mustang Mach-E (Changan Ford version)
 Geely Emgrand S (Geely Emgrand GS facelift)
 Geely Xingyue L
 Genesis G80
 Genesis Electrified G80
 Genesis GV80
 Genesis X
 Haval X Dog Concept
 Haval XY Concept
 Honda Breeze plug-in hybrid
 Honda SUV e: Prototype
 Hongqi L-Concept
 Hongqi S9 production version
 Hyundai Ioniq 5
 Kia EV6 (public debut)
 Kia Carnival
 Kia Sportage Ace
 Kia K3 EV
 Lexus ES (facelift)
 Lexus LF-Z Electrified concept
 Lincoln Corsair PHEV (Asian debut)
 Lincoln Zephyr Reflection concept
 Lynk & Co 02 Sport increased horsepower version of the 02
 Maserati Levante Hybrid
 Mazda CX-30 EV
 Mercedes-Benz C-Class L extended wheelbase version of the new C-class
 Mercedes-Benz EQB
 Mercedes-Benz EQS 450+ and 580 4MATIC
 MG Cyberster concept
 Modern Auto in, first model of a BAW sub-brand
 ORA ORA Big Cat
 ORA Lightning Cat prototype
 ORA Punk Cat prototype
 Roewe i5 / Ei5 facelift
 Roewe Jing
 Škoda Octavia Pro extended wheelbase version of the 2020 Octavia
 TANK 300
 TANK 300 Cybertank concept
 Tank 700
 Tank 800
 Toyota bZ4X
 Toyota Highlander IV / Crown Kluger
 Volkswagen ID.6 Crozz (FAW-Volkswagen) / X (SAIC-Volkswagen version)
 Volkswagen Passat SAIC-VW version facelift
 Volkswagen Talagon
 Weltmeister W6
 Wuling Hongguang Mini EV Cabrio concept
 Wuling Xingchen
 Xpeng P5
 Zeekr 001, production version based on the Lynk & Co zero concept
 IM Airo concept
 IM L7
 IM LS7 concept
 ZX Auto ZTE G9

2019
The 2019 show ran from 16 April to 25 April.
 16–17 April — Press day
 18–25 April — Open to the public

Introductions

 Aion LX
 Aiways U5
 Aiways U7 Ion Concept
 Alfa Romeo Giulia Quadrifoglio NRING
 Alfa Romeo Stelvio Quadrifoglio NRING
 Aston Martin Lagonda All-Terrain Concept (Asian debut)
 Aston Martin AM-RB 003 Concept (Asian debut)
 Aston Martin Rapide E
 Audi AI:me Concept
 Audi Q2 L e-tron
 Audi Q3 (Asian debut)
 BAIC Arcfox ECF
 BAIC Arcfox-GT Race Edition
 Baojun RM-C Concept
 Baojun RS-5
 Bentley Continental GT Convertible (Asian debut)
 Bentley Mulsanne W.O. Edition by Mulliner (Asian debut)
 BMW 3 Series Li (G28)
 BMW 745e, 745Le & 745Le xDrive
 BMW M850i xDrive Coupé
 BMW X1 xDrive25Le (F49)
 BMW X3 M Competition
 BMW X4 M Competition
 BMW X7 (Asian debut)
 BMW Vision iNext Concept (Asian debut)
 Bordrin iV7
 Brabus 800G
 Buick Encore
 Buick Encore GX
 Buick GL8 Avenir Concept
 Buick LaCrosse (facelift)
 Buick Velite 6 EV
 BYD e2
 BYD e-Seed GT Concept
 BYD Song Pro
 Cadillac XT6 (Asian debut)
 Changan CS75 Plus
 Chevrolet Onix
 Chevrolet Tracker
 Chevrolet Trailblazer
 Ciimo X-NV Concept
 Citroën C3-XR (facelift)
 Enovate ME7
 Enovate ME-S Concept
 Ford Escape CN-Spec.
 Geely Jia Ji MPV
 Geely Preface Concept
 Geely Xingyue
 Grove Granite
 Gumpert Nathalie Race
 Gyon Matchless Concept
 HanTeng Red 01 Concept
 Hezhong Eureka 02 Concept
 Honda Odyssey Sport Hybrid
 Hongqi E-HS3
 Hongqi H5 FCEV
 Hongqi H5 Sports
 Hongqi HS7
 Hyundai ix25
 Hyundai Sonata
 Hyundai Veloster N
 Icona Nucleus Concept (Asian debut)
 Infiniti Qs Inspiration Concept
 JAC iEV S4
 Jaguar I-Pace eTrophy
 Jeep Gladiator (Asian debut)
 Jeep Grand Commander PHEV
 Jetta VA3
 Jetta VS5
 Jetta VS7
 Karma Revero GT
 Karma Pininfarina GT Concept
 Karma SC1 Vision Concept
 Kia K3
 Lamborghini Huracán Evo (Asian debut)
 Lamborghini Urus
 Landwind Xiaoyao
 Leapmotor C-More concept
 Lexus LM
 Lotus Evora GT4 Concept
 Lynk & Co 01 (facelift)
 Maserati Levante GTS
 Maserati Levante Trofeo
 Maxus D60e
 Maxus G50
 Maxus T70
 Mazda MX-5 RF
 McLaren 600LT Spider (Asian debut)
 McLaren 720S Spider (Asian debut)
 Mercedes-AMG A35 L Sedan
 Mercedes-AMG E53 Coupé 4Matic
 Mercedes-AMG GT50 4-door Coupé
 Mercedes-Benz EQC (Asian debut)
 Mercedes-Benz Concept GLB
 Mercedes-Benz GLE (Asian debut)
 MG 6 (facelift)
 MG 6 XPower TCR Racecar Concept
 Mini Clubman (facelift)
 Mitsubishi e-Yi Concept
 Nissan IMQ Concept
 Nissan IMs Concept
 Nissan Sylphy
 Nio ES6
 Nio ET Preview Concept
 Ora R1
 Peugeot 508L
 Porsche 911 Carrera 4S Coupé & Cabriolet (Asian debut)
 Porsche Cayenne Coupé
 Qiantu Concept 2
 Qiantu K20
 Qiantu K25 Concept
 Qiantu K50 Spyder Concept
 Qoros Mile II Concept
 Range Rover Evoque II (Asian debut)
 Renault City K-ZE electric
 Renault Kadjar
 Roewe Marvel X Pro
 Roewe Vision-i Concept
 Rolls-Royce Cullinan
 Seres SF5
 Škoda Vision iV Concept (Asian debut)
 Toyota C-HR EV
 Toyota IZOA EV
 Toyota RAV4 Hybrid
 Volkswagen e-Lavida
 Volkswagen Polo Plus
 Volkswagen I.D. Roomzz Concept
 Volkswagen SMV Concept
 Volkswagen SUV Coupé Concept
 Volkswagen Teramont X
 W Motors MUSE Concept
 WEY VV5
 WEY X Concept
 Xpeng P7
 Zedriv GT3 EV Concept
 Zedriv GX5

2017
The 2017 show ran from 19 April to 28 April.
 19–20 April — Press & VIPs preview
 21–23 April — Trade visitors preview
 24–28 April — Open to the public

Introductions

 Acura TLX-L
 Aston Martin V8 Vantage S GB Edition
 Aston Martin Vanquish S Volante (Asian debut)
 Audi RS 3 LMS
 Audi RS5 Coupe (Asian debut)
 Audi R8 LMS Cup 
 Audi E-Tron Sportback Concept
 BMW 5 Series LWB
 BMW M4 CS
 BMW Concept X2 (Asian debut)
 BYD Dynasty Concept
 Chery Tiggo Sport Coupe Concept
 Chevrolet FNR-X Concept
 Chrysler Portal Concept
 Citroën C5 Aircross
 Ferrari 812 Superfast (Asian debut)
 Geely MPV Concept
 Honda CR-V Hybrid
 Hyundai ix35 (Chinese market facelift)
 Icona Vulcano Titanium
 Jaguar I-Pace Concept (Asian debut)
 Jeep Yuntu Concept
 Kia K2 Cross
 Kia Pegas
 Lamborghini Huracán Performante (Asian debut)
 Lexus NX (facelift)
 Lynk & Co 01 SUV
 Lynk & Co 03 Sedan Concept
 McLaren 720S (Asian debut)
 MG E-Motion Concept
 Mercedes-Benz Concept A Sedan
 Mercedes-Benz GLA 260 Sport
 Mercedes-AMG S63
 Mercedes-Benz S-Class (facelift)
 Mercedes-Maybach S680
 Mini Countryman JCW (Asian debut)
 NIO EP9
 NIO ES8
 NIO Eve Concept
 Nissan Kicks
 Pininfarina Hybrid Kinetic K550/ K750
 Porsche Panamera Sport Turismo (Asian debut)
 Qiantu K50
 Qoros K-EV Concept
 Renault R.S. 2027 Vision Concept Formula One
 Škoda Vision E Concept
 Tesla Motors Model 3
 Toyota Fun Sedan Concept
 VLF Force 1 V10 Roadster
 Volkswagen Phideon PHEV
 Volkswagen I.D. Crozz Concept
 Volkswagen C-Trek

2015

Introductions

 Aston Martin Lagonda Taraf (Asian debut)
 Audi Prologue Allroad Concept
 Cadillac CT6 Plug-in Hybrid
 Chevrolet FNR Concept
 Ford Taurus
 Honda Concept D
 Hyundai Tucson Concept
 Hyundai County Chinese Spec - Later inspired to Hyundai County  facelift in 2020.
 Lexus ES
 McLaren 540C Coupe
 Mercedes-Benz Concept GLC Coupe
 Nissan Lannia
 Peugeot 308 R Hybrid
 Qoros 2 SUV Concept
 Rolls-Royce Phantom Limelight Collection
 Volkswagen C Coupe GTE Concept
 Volvo XC90 Excellence
 W Motors Lykan Hypersport

2013

Introductions

 Acura SUV-X Concept
 Audi A6L
 BAIC Concept 900
 BMW X4 Concept
 Buick Riviera Concept 
 Chery B13/M14
 Chevrolet Aveo and 'Aveo Xtreme'
 Detroit Electric SP:01
 Citroën DS Wild Rubis Concept
 Ford Mondeo
 Honda Concept M
 Honda Jade
 Hongqi HQD concept
 Hyundai Mistra
 Icona Vulcano Concept (Asian debut)
 KIA Cub Concept
 Lamborghini Aventador LP720-4 50° Anniversario
 Maserati Ghibli
 Mercedes-Benz GLA Concept
 MG CS Concept
 Nissan Friend-Me Concept
 Peugeot 301
 Spyker 'La Turbie
 Suzuki Authentics Concept
 Volkswagen CrossBlue Coupe Concept

2011

Introductions

 Audi A3 e-tron Concept
 BMW Concept M5
 Buick Envision Concept
 Mercedes-Benz A-Class Concept
 Peugeot SXC Concept
 Subaru XV Concept
 Volvo Concept Universe

See also
Auto China

References

External links
 
 Auto Shanghai at Auto Fairs

Auto shows in China
Automotive industry in China
1985 establishments in China
Recurring events established in 1985
Pudong
Events in Shanghai
Biennial events